Marcelo Tomás Barrios Vera and Nicolás Jarry were the defending champions but only Barrios Vera chose to defend his title, partnering José Hernández-Fernández. Barrios Vera lost in the semifinals to Romain Arneodo and Jonathan Eysseric.

Arneodo and Eysseric won the title after defeating Guido Andreozzi and Guillermo Durán 7–6(7–4), 1–6, [12–10] in the final.

Seeds

Draw

References

External links
 Main draw

Challenger ATP Cachantún Cup - Doubles
2018 Doubles